USS Noble (1861) was a wooden bark purchased during the American Civil War by the Union Navy 2 December 1861 at Sag Harbor, New York.

Noble was selected to be used as part of the obstructions placed in the "Stone Fleet" – a fleet of hulks sunk in selected waterways of the Confederate States of America to prevent passage of ships.

She was sunk in a channel leading to Savannah, Georgia, early in 1862.

See also

Union Blockade

References

Barques of the United States Navy
Ships of the Union Navy
Ships of the Stone Fleet
Scuttled vessels
Shipwrecks of the American Civil War
Shipwrecks of the Georgia (U.S. state) coast
Maritime incidents in 1862